Nanda Sydney Ellawala  (13 November 1939 – 1994) was a Ceylonese politician. He was a Member of Parliament from the Ratnapura electorate.

Early life and family
Born to Robert Sydney Ellawala and Mallika Kobbekaduwa of the Radala Ellawala family. A descended of William Ellawala, he was a cousin of Sirimavo Bandaranaike who would become Prime Minister of Ceylon.

Political career
Nanda Ellawala contested the Ratnapura electorate from the Sri Lanka Freedom Party in the 1970 parliamentary elections winning against P.B. Wijesundara gaining 42,004 votes to 22,633 votes and entered parliament. He was defeated in the 1977 parliamentary elections by the United National Party candidate G. V. Punchinilame by 23,525 votes to 16,002  votes. He was again re-elected to parliament from Ratnapura in the 1989 parliamentary elections and held the seat until his death in 1994, when it was succeeded by his son Nalanda Ellawala who was elected to parliament in the 1994 parliamentary elections, who held the seat until his death in 1997.

Family
He married Surangani Tennekoon. They had two children, Nalanda Ellawala and Visaka Ellawala.

See also
List of political families in Sri Lanka

References

Sri Lankan Buddhists
Sinhalese politicians
Members of the 7th Parliament of Ceylon
Members of the 9th Parliament of Sri Lanka
Sri Lanka Freedom Party politicians
1939 births
1994 deaths